Mid-Atlantic District is a regional designation used by many organizations and  may refer to any of the following:

 Mid-Atlantic District (BHS), one of the districts of the Barbershop Harmony Society
Mid-Atlantic District (Church of the Brethren)

See also
Mid-Atlantic (disambiguation)